Hubert Davison (21 March 1905 – 24 April 1987) was a South African cricketer. He played in four first-class matches for Eastern Province from 1925/26 to 1929/30.

See also
 List of Eastern Province representative cricketers

References

External links
 

1905 births
1987 deaths
South African cricketers
Eastern Province cricketers
Cricketers from Port Elizabeth